Municipal Okrug 72 is a municipal okrug in Frunzensky District, one of the eighty-one low-level municipal divisions  of the federal city of St. Petersburg, Russia. As of the 2010 Census, its population was 68,333.

Boundary
In the north along Bela Kuna street with 71 municipal district of St. Petersburg (Volkovskoe) while in the east lies along the Moscow line of the railway with the Nevsky district.
In the south lies along the Yuzhnoye highway with the 75th municipal district of St. Petersburg while in the west along Bukharestskaya street with municipal district No. 73 (Kupchino)

References

Frunzensky District, Saint Petersburg